In message queueing the dead letter queue is a service implementation to store messages that meet one or more of the following criteria:

 Message that is sent to a queue that does not exist. 
 Queue length limit exceeded.
 Message length limit exceeded.
 Message is rejected by another queue exchange.
 Message reaches a threshold read counter number, because it is not consumed. Sometimes this is called a "back out queue".
 The message expires due to per-message TTL (time to live)
 Message is not processed successfully.

Storing these messages in a dead letter queue enables analysis of common patterns and potential software problems.

Queueing systems that incorporate dead letter queues include Amazon EventBridge, Amazon Simple Queue Service, Apache ActiveMQ, Google Cloud Pub/Sub, HornetQ, Microsoft Message Queuing, Microsoft Azure Event Grid and Azure Service Bus, WebSphere MQ, Solace PubSub+, Rabbit MQ, Apache Kafka and Apache Pulsar.

See also 

 Poison message
 Dead letter mail

References

Inter-process communication
Events (computing)